Aylin Langreuter is a contemporary concept and appropriation artist from Munich.

Life and work 

Aylin Langreuter was born in 1976 in Munich, Germany. She studied at the Academy of Fine Arts Munich, class of Gerd Winner, graduating in 2001, when she also cofounded Wahnsinn und Methode GmbH. With the support of "Stiftung Kulturfonds" government stipend she published her first catalog, "Erster Teil" (Eng. Part One") in 2005. Same year she applied the philosophy studies, which will later influence her art in the following years. Her work has appeared mostly, but not only, in the single exhibitions in the Galerie Wittenbrink, Munich. She has also cofounded Dante – Goods and Bads with her partner, industrial designer, Christophe de la Fontaine. Aylin Langreuter and Christophe de la Fontaine have been appointed professors of Industrial Design at State Academy of Fine Arts Stuttgart

Style and philosophy 

In her works, Aylin Langreuter has a philosophical-aesthetic approach, playing with semantic shifts between form and content. She is not treating her objects in the usual self-made, rough, unwelcoming way – she has a relationship of the best possible care which defines the initial situation, unfolding a network of possible meanings.

She found herself always lingering between applied and fine arts, producing applied art which you can't apply and design with no practical function, but abstraction of function, making minimal invasive changes that render an object's reality into fiction: the transcendence of the inanimate into something that has psychological or moral conditions. Interested in shape and order, she has always looked for unlikely places. She experimented with the tension that results from tampering with order, reversing it, abstracting it to the point where the result loses all connection with its basis. This way the beauty, the absurdity, or even the humor of an objects gains a new kind of visibility that was lost before the profanity of its function. 
The observer’s challenge would be the translation: she considers that only the context of Art, the undemanding, unencumbered space of an exhibition, facilitates the chance of a change of perspective, where in the function-free environment, the gaze meets the object in a way that gives it another life – or even: a life.
Each of her objects presentation is an integral part of the work itself. To achieve this she sometimes "borrows" from others. She sometimes uses quotations, text fragments, photographs, the peculiarity of a given space, light, graphic elements. It is sometimes this interdisciplinary interaction itself what creates the context that makes the piece work. In a world whose language you don't understand, you have to use whatever you have to make yourself understood.

References

Further reading
 Petra Shmidt, The Design Label Dante, Form Design Magazine, August 2014
 Chiara dal Canto, Modern fairytale, Belle, November 2014
 Luigina Bolis, Jump, Corriere della Sera Living, October 2014
 Petra Shmidt, The Design Label Dante, Form Design Magazine, August 2014
 Oliver Herwig, Du bist der Boss, Manual, February 2014 
 Lecture on Belgrade Design Week 2013, Aylin Langreuter and Christophe de la Fontaine
 Christopher Roth and Georg Diez, Aylin Langreuter, Jovis Verlag, Berlin, 2011, 
 Heike Endter, Neonstiche, Galerie Wittenbrink, München, 2011
 artist info Aylin Langreuter, about Aylin Langreuter 
 Andreas Neumeister, Function Follows Fairytale, Blumenbar Verlag, Munich, 2010, 
 Catalogue Erster Teil, Blumenbar Verlag, Munich, 2004, 
 damit bin ich gemeint (www.damitbinichgemeint.de), published by Wahnsinn und Methode GmbH, München, 2002

1976 births
Living people
21st-century German women artists
German conceptual artists
Women conceptual artists
Artists from Munich